Scottsboro High School is a public institution located in Scottsboro, Alabama.

History
Scottsboro High School was originally established as Jackson County High School in 1913. In 1957, the school's name was changed from Jackson County High School to Scottsboro High School.

Notable people
Kenneth Carter – Rhode Island politician 
Robert E. Jones Jr. – Former and last member of House of Representatives from Alabama's 8th congressional district
Pat Trammell – University of Alabama football player and Heisman Trophy finalist

References

External links
Public School Review information

Public high schools in Alabama
Schools in Jackson County, Alabama